John Matthew Stafford (born February 7, 1988) is an American football quarterback for the Los Angeles Rams of the National Football League (NFL). He played college football at Georgia, where he was a first-team All-American, and was selected first overall by the Detroit Lions in the 2009 NFL Draft. Ranking in the top 20 for all-time in pass attempts, completions, passing yards, and passing touchdowns, Stafford is fourth in all-time passing yards per game and the fastest NFL player to reach 40,000 passing yards.

As the Lions' primary starter from 2009 to 2020, Stafford had a breakout season in 2011 when he became the fourth NFL quarterback to throw for over 5,000 yards in a single season, while leading the Lions to their first playoff appearance since 1999. He led Detroit to two further postseason runs in 2014 and 2016, earning Pro Bowl honors during the former and setting the NFL season record for most comeback wins in the latter. After mutually agreeing to part ways with the Lions, Stafford was traded to the Rams in 2021 and led them to victory in Super Bowl LVI.

Early years
Stafford was born in Tampa, Florida to John and Margaret Stafford. He lived in Dunwoody, Georgia, while his father attended graduate school at the University of Georgia. He has one sibling, an older sister named Page. His family then moved to Dallas, Texas, and Stafford attended Highland Park High School with Los Angeles Dodgers pitcher Clayton Kershaw. He was coached by Randy Allen and was widely considered to be one of the best high school quarterbacks in the United States in the Class of 2006, ranked ahead of Tim Tebow.

In 2005, he led his team to a perfect 15–0 record and won the UIL 4A Division I State Championship. During the playoff run, Stafford beat Ryan Mallett's Texarkana Texas 38–31, as well as Jevan Snead's Stephenville 41–38. Stafford had over 4,000 yards passing despite not playing in the first three games of the season due to a knee injury. Stafford received numerous accolades, including being named to the Parade All-America Team and the USA Today Pre-Season Super 25 in 2005. He also won the MVP and Best Arm awards at the 2005 EA Sports Elite 11 Quarterback Camp and was named the 2005 EA Sports National Player of the Year. Regarded as a five-star recruit by Rivals.com, Stafford was listed as the No. 1 pro-style quarterback prospect in the class of 2006 by Rivals.com.

Before he had even started a game at the collegiate level, analyst Mel Kiper Jr. predicted, correctly, that Stafford would eventually be the first pick in the NFL Draft.

College career

2006 season

Stafford graduated early from high school and enrolled at the University of Georgia in January, where he became the first true freshman quarterback to start for the Georgia Bulldogs football team since Quincy Carter in 1998, and first out of high school to start since Eric Zeier in 1991. Stafford wore number 7 at Georgia. He completed five of 12 passes for 102 yards and one touchdown in a Georgia spring game.

Stafford debuted late in the season opener of the 2006 season against Western Kentucky and went 3 of 5 passing for 40 yards and a touchdown pass in the 48–12 victory. During the season's third game, against South Carolina, starting quarterback Joe Tereshinski III was injured, forcing Stafford to come off the bench. Although he completed just 8 of 19 passes for 171 yards and three interceptions, Georgia won the game, 18–0. Against University of Alabama Birmingham the following week, Stafford made his first collegiate start. Georgia won, 34–0. Victories over Colorado and Ole Miss improved Georgia's record to 5–0, but the heart of the conference schedule loomed.

The rest of the season was inconsistent for Stafford and the Bulldogs. Following home losses to both Tennessee and Vanderbilt, head coach Mark Richt named Stafford the starter for the rest of the season ahead of Tereshinski. Stafford completed 20 of 32 passes for 267 yards and two touchdowns in a 27–24 win over Mississippi State, and was named the SEC Freshman of the Week for his efforts. Statistically, he had his best game of the season against the #5 Auburn Tigers. Stafford finished the game 14 of 20 for 219 yards and a touchdown, and added 83 rushing yards and a touchdown on seven carries in Georgia's 37–15 upset win. The following week, Stafford led the Bulldogs on a 12-play, 64-yard drive and threw a late game-winning touchdown pass to Mohamed Massaquoi in Georgia's 15–12 win over #16 Georgia Tech.

Stafford completed his freshman season by leading Georgia to a 31–24 come-from-behind victory over Virginia Tech in the Chick-fil-A Bowl, after the Bulldogs trailed 21–3 at halftime. Stafford threw for 129 yards and a second half touchdown to spark the comeback and allow Georgia to finish the season with a 9–4 record. Stafford finished with 1,749 passing yards, seven touchdowns, and 13 interceptions.

2007 season

Stafford threw for 234 yards and two touchdowns as the Bulldogs defeated the Oklahoma State Cowboys 35–14 in the season opener. Following a 16–12 loss to South Carolina and a 45–16 victory over Western Carolina, the Bulldogs avoided an 0–2 start in SEC play by escaping Bryant–Denny Stadium with an overtime win over Alabama. Stafford connected with senior wide receiver Mikey Henderson on the Bulldogs' first play from scrimmage in overtime for the winning score. Following the Alabama game, Georgia two of their next three. In the win over #9 Florida, he completed 11 of 18 passes for 217 yards and three touchdowns, including a career-long touchdown pass of 84 yards to Mohamed Massaquoi and a 53-yard touchdown pass to Henderson. Georgia closed out the regular season on a six-game winning streak. The wins over Florida, Auburn, and Georgia Tech marked the first time that Georgia had defeated all three rivals in the same season since 1982.

Stafford had 175 yards passing and a touchdown pass during Georgia's 41–10 rout of the #10 Hawaii Warriors in the 2008 Sugar Bowl. He completed 194 of 348 passes for 2,523 yards (194.1/game) and 19 touchdowns as well as two rushing touchdowns for the season. He finished fifth in the SEC in pass completions and sixth in passing touchdowns. Stafford helped lead Georgia to an 11–2 record, their best mark since the 2002 season, and a #2 ranking in the Final AP Poll.

2008 season

Stafford was chosen to Athlon Sports preseason Heisman Favorites Others To Watch list. Georgia was ranked #1 in both the preseason coaches poll and the AP Poll, marking the first time Georgia has ever been #1 in the preseason version of either poll. The team entered the 2008 season with the longest active winning streak among the 66 BCS conference teams, having won its last seven games of the 2007 season. He helped lead them to victories in their first four games to move the winning streak to 11. Stafford and the Bulldogs suffered their first setback in a 41–30 loss to #8 Alabama on September 27. Stafford rebounded by helping lead the team to victories in five of the next six games, the lone exception being a 49–10 loss to the eventual National Champion Florida Gators. In that stretch, he threw for over 300 yards in victories over Tennessee and Kentucky. In the final regular season game against Georgia Tech, Stafford completed 24 out of 39 attempts for 407 yards and five touchdowns, setting personal collegiate highs for passing yards and touchdowns in a single game, albeit a 45–42 loss. Stafford finished the season with a conference-leading 235 pass completions for 3,459 passing yards, the second most in school history, and 25 touchdowns, the single-season record for passing touchdowns. He led the SEC in pass attempts and passing completions while finishing third for passing touchdowns. Georgia finished the regular season with a 9–3 mark and qualified for the Capitol One Bowl. After defeating Michigan State 24–12 and winning the MVP of the 2009 Capital One Bowl, Stafford finished his three years at Georgia with a 3–0 record in bowl games and a 6–3 record in rivalry games (1–2 against Florida, 3–0 against Auburn, and 2–1 against Georgia Tech). Stafford chose to forgo his senior season and entered the 2009 NFL Draft.

Awards and honors
Named SEC Freshman of the Week twice during the 2006 season
Rivals.com's National Freshman of the Week for his performance against Auburn on November 11, 2006
University of Georgia 2006 Offensive Newcomer of the Year Award 
Named to the 2006 SEC Coaches' All-Freshman Team
Named Offensive MVP of the 2006 Chick-fil-A Bowl
Named All-America in 2008 by Pro Football Weekly
Named to Second-team All-SEC in 2008
MVP of the 2009 Capital One Bowl

Statistics

Stafford's 25 touchdown passes in 2008 broke the previous Georgia record of 24, set by D. J. Shockley (2005) and Eric Zeier (1993, 1994).
Stafford's 3,459 yards passing in 2008 were second-most in Georgia history, surpassed only by Zeier's 3,525 yards in 1993.

Professional career
In April 2008, several NFL analysts predicted Stafford would be the #1 pick in the 2009 NFL Draft if he chose to leave school early. He eventually did, and on April 24, 2009, agreed to record contract terms with the Detroit Lions to become the first overall pick of the 2009 NFL Draft, one day before the draft was held. Stafford became the fourth player out of Georgia to be the first overall selection in the draft and the first since Harry Babcock in 1953. The six-year contract reportedly contained $41.7 million in guaranteed money (the most guaranteed to any player in NFL history until July 30, 2010, when quarterback Sam Bradford signed a deal with $50 million guaranteed) and carried a total value of up to $78 million. Detroit negotiated a deal with Stafford on April 24, 2009, less than 24 hours before the draft.

Detroit Lions

2009 season

On September 6, 2009, Lions head coach Jim Schwartz announced that Stafford would be the Lions' starting quarterback heading into the season. He was the first Lions rookie quarterback to start in Week 1 since Greg Landry in 1968. He completed 16 of 37 passes for 205 yards and three interceptions. He ran in a one-yard touchdown early in the third quarter of the 45–27 loss. In the following game, a 27–13 loss to the Minnesota Vikings, Stafford threw his first career touchdown pass on an eight-yard completion to Calvin Johnson. He recorded his first win as a Lion in the next game against the Washington Redskins. He passed for 241 yards and a touchdown in the 19–14 victory. The win was significant for the Lions' as it snapped a 19-game losing streak going back to the 2007 season.

On November 22, 2009, Stafford threw five touchdowns in a 38–37 win over the Cleveland Browns, becoming the youngest quarterback ever to do so, being more than a year younger than the former record holder, Dan Marino. In a thrilling ending, Stafford received high acclaim when he stepped back onto the field despite team doctors' urge to stay on the sideline after suffering a separated shoulder on the previous play and threw the final touchdown pass as time expired. In addition to the five touchdown passes, Stafford accumulated 422 yards passing, a record for a rookie at that time. For his performance, Stafford won NFC Offensive Player of the Week and Pepsi Rookie of the Week. Stafford was mic'd up for the game for NFL Films. The show's creator Steve Sabol said it was the most dramatic performance he's seen in the show's 30-year history. To begin Week 12 on Thanksgiving Day, Stafford went 20 of 43 for 213 yards with a touchdown pass but threw four interceptions in the 34–12 loss against the Green Bay Packers.

Stafford was placed on injured reserve on December 24 for the minor knee injury. Stafford concluded his rookie season having passed for 2,267 yards, 13 touchdowns, and 20 interceptions. In all 10 of the games he started for the Lions, he either threw or ran for a touchdown despite the Lions finishing the season 2–8 in games that he started in. The Lions did not win another game without Stafford and finished with a 2–14 record overall.

2010 season

Stafford injured his right shoulder in the season-opening 19–14 loss against the Chicago Bears on September 12. Stafford returned on October 31 in Week 8 against the Washington Redskins and threw for 212 yards, four touchdowns, and one interception to lead the Lions to a 37–25 win. In the next game, Stafford re-injured his right shoulder in the fourth quarter of the Lions 23–20 overtime loss to the New York Jets after throwing for 240 yards, two touchdowns, and recording a rushing touchdown. The Lions announced that Dr. James Andrews had performed surgery on Stafford's throwing shoulder, which included an AC joint repair and a clavicle shaving. The surgery ended his 2010 season, leaving the Lions at 1–2 in games he started and bringing his career total with the Lions to 3–10. The Lions finished the 2010 season with a 6–10 record and missed the playoffs.

2011 season

The Lions opened the season on September 11 against the Tampa Bay Buccaneers with high expectations. Stafford played well, throwing for 305 yards, three touchdowns, and an interception in a 27–20 win, the first season opener the Lions had won since 2007. Another strong performance followed, with Stafford throwing for four touchdowns, 294 yards, and an interception against the Kansas City Chiefs in Week 2, leading the Lions to a 48–3 blowout victory, the largest win margin in team history. Stafford won the FedEx Air NFL Player of the Week for his performance. In Weeks 3 and 4, Stafford led the team to consecutive comeback victories, a 26–23 overtime comeback victory over the Minnesota Vikings after trailing 20–0 at halftime in Week 3, and a 34–30 win over the Dallas Cowboys after trailing 27–3 with 12:27 left in the third quarter.

Week 5 saw Stafford orchestrate a 24–13 win over the Chicago Bears, going 19 of 26 for 219 yards and two touchdowns. This marked the first time the Lions had gone 5–0 since 1956, the year before they won their last NFL Championship. In Week 10 against the Bears, Stafford threw four interceptions, including two that were returned for touchdowns on consecutive drives. The game was marred by a brawl that began when Stafford threw Bears cornerback D. J. Moore to the ground by his helmet during a block on an interception return. In response, Moore attacked Stafford and a sideline-clearing brawl ensued. Stafford was fined $7,500 for his role in the brawl.

On November 20, Stafford threw for 335 yards and tied his career-high with five touchdowns as the Lions defeated the Carolina Panthers in another comeback, 49–35, after trailing 24–7 in the second quarter. Stafford became the first quarterback since at least 1950 to win back to back games after trailing by at least 20 points, the first to win three games in a season after trailing by at least 17 points, and the first to win four games in a season after trailing by at least 13 points according to STATS, LLC.

On January 1, 2012, Stafford became the fourth quarterback in NFL history and third in the 2011 season, along with Tom Brady and Drew Brees, to throw for 5,000 passing yards in a season after recording a career-high 520 passing yards against the Green Bay Packers in a 45–41 loss in Week 17. In this game, Stafford threw an interception on an attempted 37-yard touchdown pass that, had he been successful, he would've broken Norm Van Brocklin's record for most yards in a game. The accomplishment made Stafford the second-youngest quarterback in NFL history, at the age of 23 years and 328 days, to reach 5,000 yards, behind only Dan Marino. Stafford became the first player in Lions' franchise history to have two games in a single season with at least five passing touchdowns. Over the last four games of the 2011 regular season, Stafford became the only quarterback in NFL history to pass for over 1,500 yards (1,511) and 14 touchdowns over a four-game span. Stafford and the Lions finished the regular season with a 10–6 record, good enough for the Lions to make their first playoff appearance since 1999.

During the Wild Card Round in the playoffs against the New Orleans Saints, Stafford threw for 380 yards with three touchdown passes and added a rushing touchdown. However, he threw two late interceptions in the fourth quarter that sealed the loss for the Lions, as they were defeated, 45–28.

Stafford was named a Pro Bowl alternate for the NFC after the 2011 NFL season. He was later named the 2011 Pro Football Weekly Comeback Player of the Year, AP Comeback Player of the Year, and NFL Alumni Quarterback of the Year. He was ranked 41st by his fellow players on the NFL Top 100 Players of 2012.

2012 season

While the 2011 season proved to be the best season of Stafford's young career, 2012 was one full of setbacks. During the opening game against the St. Louis Rams, Stafford threw three interceptions and one touchdown pass. However, the Lions won the game 27–23. Stafford and the Lions lost the next three games to the San Francisco 49ers, Tennessee Titans, and Minnesota Vikings. In the ensuing weeks, the Lions managed to win three games, including impressive comeback wins against the Seattle Seahawks and Philadelphia Eagles, and a dominating performance against the Jacksonville Jaguars. These proved to be the final winning games of the 2012 season as they ended the season with an eight-game losing streak and with a 4–12 record. One highlight in the losing streak was a game against the Atlanta Falcons, where Stafford recorded a career-high 37 completions for 443 passing yards and one interception in the 31–18 loss.

Stafford finished the season with a league-leading 435 pass completions for 20 touchdown passes, significantly less compared to the 41 touchdowns he passed for in the 2011 season; 17 interceptions, one more than 2011, and second most in his career since his rookie season; 4,967 passing yards on 727 attempts (an NFL record; the previous record was 691 by Drew Bledsoe); and a QB rating of 79.8, the lowest since his rookie season. He rushed for a career-high 126 yards and four rushing touchdowns on 35 carries. He was ranked #76 among his fellow players on the NFL Top 100 Players of 2013.

2013 season

On July 7, 2013, Stafford agreed to a three-year, $53 million extension with the Lions. He was guaranteed $41.5 million through 2017.

Stafford completed 23-of-35 passes for 242 yards, one touchdown, and one interception on September 29 in a 40–32 win against the Chicago Bears. That gave him 14,069 yards through 49 games, surpassing Kurt Warner (13,864) for the best 50-game start to a career.

"I might (reflect on that) when I'm done playing someday," Stafford said. "I had no idea about that, or that it was coming. It's something that I'll probably look back on when I'm done and realize it was something pretty special."

Stafford set a record for completions over 50 games at 1,214, over Marc Bulger's 1,115. He finished second in career 300-yard passing performances through 50 games at 19, trailing Warner's 29.

Stafford led the Lions to a 5–3 record entering their mid-season bye. Stafford defeated the Cowboys 31–30 in the final game before the bye, throwing for 488 yards and a touchdown despite two interceptions; down 30–24 with just 62 seconds to work with and no timeouts Stafford completed a 23-yard pass to Calvin Johnson to the Cowboys 1-yard line; he hustled the team to the line as though to spike the ball, but instead jumped over the line for the winning touchdown with 14 seconds to go, to go to 5–3.

However, the Lions finished 2–6 for a final record of 7–9. Lions head coach Jim Schwartz was fired following the season. Stafford finished the 2013 season with 4,650 passing yards, 29 touchdowns and 19 interceptions. He was ranked #100 on the NFL Top 100 Players of 2014 players' list.

2014 season

On January 14, 2014, the Lions announced Jim Caldwell as their new head coach. The Lions rebounded from a disappointing 2013 campaign by finishing with an 11–5 record, thus earning the NFC's 6th seed, their first playoff appearance since 2011.  He started the 2014 season off strong with 346 passing yards and two passing touchdowns in a 35–14 victory over the New York Giants. In Week 13, against the Chicago Bears, he passed for a season-high 390 passing yards and two passing touchdowns in the 34–17 victory. During the season, Stafford became the fastest quarterback in NFL history to reach 20,000 passing yards. He accomplished the feat in his 71st game, breaking Dan Marino's mark of 74. He led the NFL with five game-winning drives. Stafford finished the 2014 season with 4,257 passing yards, 22 passing touchdowns, and 12 interceptions, to go along with a QB rating of 85.7.

On January 4, 2015, Stafford and the Lions went against the Dallas Cowboys, in the Wild Card Round of the playoffs. After the Lions had a 20–7 lead in the third quarter, the Cowboys scored 17 unanswered points to win 24–20. In the fourth quarter, with the Lions up 20–17, Stafford threw a pass to tight end Brandon Pettigrew. The ball hit Cowboys linebacker Anthony Hitchens on the back. Pass interference was initially called on the Cowboys. However, the officials reversed the call on the series that ended up being crucial as the Lions were forced to punt later on the drive. Stafford threw 323 passing yards, one touchdown, and one interception in the loss.

On January 19, 2015, it was announced that Stafford was selected to the 2015 Pro Bowl, his first Pro Bowl appearance. He would be replacing Peyton Manning of the Denver Broncos, due to a quad injury. For the game, he was named Pro Bowl Offensive MVP, with 316 passing yards, two touchdowns, and one interception.

2015 season

The 2015 season started rough for Stafford and the Lions with a 0–5 start. In the stretch, Stafford passed for six touchdowns and eight interceptions to go along with an average of 241 passing yards per game. The Lions got their first victory against the Chicago Bears in Week 6, with Stafford recording 405 passing yards, four passing touchdowns, and one interception in the 37–34 overtime result. In Week 12, against the Philadelphia Eagles, Stafford passed for 337 yards and five passing touchdowns in the 45–14 victory. It was the fourth time in Stafford's career with a five-touchdown game, becoming the tenth player in NFL history to pull off the feat. On December 13, 2015, in Week 14 against the St. Louis Rams, Stafford reached 25,000 passing yards in his 90th career game, becoming the fastest quarterback to reach this milestone, surpassing the previous record held by Dan Marino of 92 games. On December 21, Stafford posted a single-game career high in passer rating, and broke Jon Kitna's single-game franchise record with an 88.0 completion percentage. He completed 22 of 25 passes for 254 yards and three touchdowns to give him a career-high 148.6 passer rating in a Week 15 35–27 win over the New Orleans Saints. Stafford became the first quarterback in NFL history to complete 60 percent or more of his passes in all 16 games. He finished the 2015 season with 4,262 passing yards, 32 touchdowns, and 13 interceptions. Despite Stafford's success, the Lions finished with a 7–9 record and missed the playoffs.

2016 season

Stafford started the 2016 season off with a strong performance against the Indianapolis Colts. In the 39–35 victory, he finished with 340 passing yards and three touchdowns. The Lions followed that up with three consecutive losses before getting a narrow 24–23 win over the Philadelphia Eagles to have a 2–3 record. In the next game, against the Los Angeles Rams, he had 270 passing yards and four touchdowns in the 31–28 victory. On December 11, 2016, Stafford broke Peyton Manning's NFL record of most fourth quarter comebacks in a season with eight. In his career, he has 25 such victories, the most in the NFL since he made his debut in 2009. Stafford got the Lions to a 9–4 start but he suffered a hand injury in Week 14 and lost the last three games of the season to finish 9–7. They managed to get the sixth seed in the playoffs, only to lose to the Seattle Seahawks 26–6 in the Wild Card Round. Stafford passed for 206 yards with no touchdowns or interceptions in the loss. Stafford ended the season with 4,327 passing yards, 24 touchdowns and 10 interceptions – his sixth consecutive season with at least 4,000 passing yards. He became the fastest player in NFL history to reach the 30,000 career passing yards milestone. He became the fourth quarterback in NFL history to throw for at least 30,000 in their first eight seasons. He was ranked 31st by his peers on the NFL Top 100 Players of 2017.

2017 season

On August 28, 2017, Stafford signed a 5-year, $135 million extension with $92 million guaranteed, making him the highest-paid player in NFL history at the time.

On September 10, in Week 1 against the Arizona Cardinals, Stafford finished with 292 passing yards, four touchdowns, and an interception as the Lions rallied and won by a score of 35–23. It was his 27th fourth quarter/overtime comeback since 2011, the most in the league. In Week 2, on Monday Night Football, Stafford threw his 193rd career touchdown pass in a win over the New York Giants, passing Bob Griese for 48th on the all time touchdown pass list. On October 29, in Week 8 against the Pittsburgh Steelers, Stafford became the only player in NFL history to throw for more than 400 yards and no touchdowns in two different games. On November 6, in Week 9 against the Green Bay Packers, Stafford recorded his 200th career touchdown in the first quarter of the game, becoming the fourth quarterback in NFL history to do so before the age of 30, joining Brett Favre, Dan Marino, and Peyton Manning. On December 31, in Week 17 against the Green Bay Packers, Stafford recorded his 3,000th career completion in his 125th career game, becoming the fastest player to reach the milestone in NFL history. The Lions finished with a 9–7 record, but did not qualify for the playoffs. Stafford ended the season with 4,446 passing yards, 29 touchdowns, and 10 interceptions – his seventh consecutive season with at least 4,000 passing yards. He led the NFC in passing yards in 2017. He was ranked 31st by his peers for the second consecutive year on the list of the Top 100 NFL Players of 2018.

2018 season

Going into the 2018 season, Stafford had a new head coach in Matt Patricia. On Monday Night Football on September 10 against the New York Jets, his season opener, Stafford had four interceptions and the Lions lost the game by a score of 48–17. He rebounded statistically in the following game, a 30–27 loss to the San Francisco 49ers, with 347 yards and three touchdowns. The Lions got their first win of the season in the following game against the New England Patriots on NBC Sunday Night Football as Stafford recorded 262 yards, two touchdowns, and one interception in the 26–10 win. Overall, the rest of the season was inconsistent for Stafford and the Lions. He never passed for more than two touchdowns in any game for the rest of the season as the Lions finished with a 6–10 record. One memorable game for the Lions was a 31–0 shutout of their rival, the Green Bay Packers, with Stafford passing for 266 yards and two touchdowns in Week 17. Overall, Stafford finished with 3,777 yards, 21 touchdowns, and 11 interceptions.

2019 season

In Week 1 against the Arizona Cardinals, Stafford threw for 385 yards and three touchdowns in the 27–27 tie game. Stafford helped lead the Lions to consectuive wins over the next two games against the Chargers and Eagles. The Lions dropped consecutive games against the Chiefs and Packers in Week 4 and Week 6. On October 20, in Week 7 against the Minnesota Vikings, Stafford threw for 364 yards, four touchdowns, and one interception in the 42–30 loss. In Week 7 against the Minnesota Vikings, Stafford reached 40,000 passing yards in his 147th career game, becoming the fastest quarterback to the reach the milestone. On November 10, 2019, Stafford missed his first game since 2010, ending his streak of 136 consecutive regular-season starts. Stafford's streak was the sixth-longest for a quarterback in league history. It was eventually revealed that Stafford was diagnosed with non-displaced fractures in his upper thoracic spine, causing him to miss more time than usual. On December 18, 2019, Stafford was placed on injured reserve after missing the previous six games and the Lions missing the playoffs for the third consecutive season. At the time of his shutdown, Stafford was well on pace for a impressive statistical season. He had passed for 2,499 yards, 19 touchdowns, and five interceptions in eight games.

2020 season: Final year in Detroit

At the start of training camp, Stafford was temporarily on the reserve/COVID-19 list due to a false-positive test.

Stafford made his return from injury in Week 1 against the Chicago Bears. During the game, Stafford threw for 297 yards, one touchdown, and one interception as the Lions lost 27–23. In Week 3 against the Arizona Cardinals, Stafford threw for 270 yards and two touchdowns during the 26–23 win. This was the Lions' first win since October 27, 2019. In Week 7 against the Atlanta Falcons, Stafford threw for 340 yards and the game winning touchdown to tight end T. J. Hockenson with no time left on the clock during the 23–22 win. In Week 8 against the Indianapolis Colts, Stafford threw for 336 yards, 3 touchdowns, and an interception returned for a touchdown during the 41–21 loss.

On November 4, 2020, Stafford was placed on the reserve/COVID-19 list again after being a high-risk close contact with a non-team person who tested positive for COVID-19. On November 7, 2020, Stafford was removed from the COVID-19 list after he came back negative for the virus and was cleared for the Lions week 9 game against the Minnesota Vikings. Against the Vikings, Stafford threw for 211 yards, a touchdown, and two interceptions before leaving the game in the 4th quarter and was evaluated for a concussion. The Lions would lose 34–20.

Stafford made his return from injury in the following week's game against the Washington Football Team. During the game, Stafford threw for 276 yards and three touchdowns during the 30–27 win. In Week 13, against the Chicago Bears, he had 402 passing yards, three passing touchdowns, and one interception in the 34–30 victory. In Week 16, against the Tampa Bay Buccaneers, Stafford was forced to leave the game in the first quarter due to an ankle injury and did not return during the 47–7 loss. Overall, in the 2020 season, Stafford started all 16 games and finished with 4,084 passing yards, 26 touchdowns, and 10 interceptions.

Los Angeles Rams
On March 18, 2021, Stafford was traded to the Rams in a package involving Jared Goff, a 2021 third-round pick and two first-round picks in 2022 and 2023.

2021 season: Super Bowl LVI

Stafford made his Rams debut during Sunday Night Football against the Chicago Bears. Stafford threw for 321 yards and three touchdowns with a career-best 156.1 passer rating as the Rams won 34–14, earning NFC Offensive Player of the Week for the first time since the 2009 season. Against the Tampa Bay Buccaneers, Stafford threw for 343 yards, and four touchdowns as the Rams won 34–24, earning his second NFC Offensive Player of the Week honor of the season. Against the Seattle Seahawks in Week 5, despite injuring his finger, Stafford threw for 365 yards, a touchdown, and an interception as the Rams won 26–17. In Week 7, Stafford threw for 334 yards and three touchdowns in a 28–19 win against his former team, the Detroit Lions. Starting in Week 13, Stafford helped lead the Rams to a five-game winning streak to aide in playoff positioning. Despite a loss in Week 18 to the 49ers, the Rams won the NFC West in Stafford's first season with the team. Stafford set franchise records for pass completions, pass attempts, and passing yards and tied Kurt Warner's mark for passing touchdowns in a single season. He threw for 4,886 yards, 41 touchdowns, and an NFL leading 17 interceptions thrown as the Rams finished with a 12–5 record.

In the Wild Card Round of the playoffs, Stafford earned his first postseason victory in the 34–11 win over the Arizona Cardinals, throwing for 202 yards and two touchdowns, along with 22 rushing yards and scoring a rushing touchdown for the first time since 2016. In Stafford's first career Divisional Round appearance, he threw for 366 yards and two touchdowns and rushed for a touchdown in the 30–27 win against the Tampa Bay Buccaneers.

Playing in the NFC Championship for the first time in his career, Stafford and the Rams defeated the San Francisco 49ers by a score of 20–17. Despite being down 17–7 heading into the fourth quarter, Stafford managed to drive his team downfield culminating in a touchdown to his wide receiver Cooper Kupp, which cut the deficit to 17–14. After two more drives culminating in field goals, the Rams took the lead with 1:46 to go in the fourth quarter. The game was sealed when Jimmy Garoppolo tossed an interception to linebacker Travin Howard with the clock running out. The victory qualified the Rams for Super Bowl LVI, to be played in the Rams home stadium, SoFi Stadium. Stafford completed 31 out of 45 passes for 337 yards, two passing touchdowns, and an interception in the game.

Against the Cincinnati Bengals in Super Bowl LVI, Stafford and the Rams came away victorious on their home field with a final score of 23–20. Scoring started early in the first quarter thanks to a long drive that culminated in a Odell Beckham Jr. touchdown reception. The Bengals managed a field goal to make the score 7–3. Stafford then tossed another touchdown to wide receiver Cooper Kupp on the next possession to extend the lead to 13–3. On the first play of the second half, however, the Bengals retook the lead, 17–13. After field goals by both teams, the Rams trailed by a score of 20–16 in the fourth quarter. Stafford orchestrated a drive in the final minutes that ended with another touchdown pass to Kupp to regain the lead at 23–20. Overall, Stafford completed 26 of his 40 pass attempts for 283 yards, three passing touchdowns, and two interceptions as he earned his first championship ring in his first season with the Rams.

Stafford passed for the second-most yards in a single postseason with 1,188. He became the first quarterback since Eli Manning to lead a fourth-quarter comeback in a Conference Championship and a Super Bowl in the same playoff season. He became the first player in NFL history to pass for at least 6,000 yards and 50 touchdowns in the regular season and postseason combined all while leading a team to a Super Bowl victory in the same season. He was ranked 27th by his fellow players on the NFL Top 100 Players of 2022.

2022 season

On March 19, 2022, Stafford signed a four-year, $160 million extension with the Rams. During the offseason, Stafford underwent an elbow procedure on his right elbow after experiencing pain throughout the previous season.

In the NFL Kickoff Game against the Buffalo Bills, Stafford threw for 240 yards and a touchdown, but threw three interceptions and was sacked seven times in the 31–10 loss. In the game, Stafford became the 12th quarterback in NFL history to reach 50,000 career passing yards. He tied Drew Brees as the fastest quarterback in NFL history to reach the mark. In Week 5 against the Dallas Cowboys, Stafford completed 28 passes of 42 attempts for 308 passing yards, threw a touchdown pass and an interception in the 22–10 loss.

Stafford was put in concussion protocol following the Rams week 9 loss to the Tampa Bay Buccaneers, where he missed the Rams week 10 game against the Arizona Cardinals. The Cardinals game marked Stafford's first game as a Ram where he would not play. Stafford returned in week 11 against the New Orleans Saints, where he threw for 159 yards and two touchdowns, but left the game in the third quarter after suffering a concussion in the 27–20 loss. Following the Rams week 13 loss to the Seattle Seahawks, head coach Sean McVay revealed Stafford suffered a spinal cord contusion which would end his season. He was placed on injured reserve on December 3, 2022. In nine games, Stafford finished with 2,087 passing yards, ten touchdowns, and eight interceptions. The Rams went 3–6 in the games Stafford played, contributing to a disappointing 5–12 season. The Rams' 12 losses marked the most in NFL history for a defending Super Bowl champion.

NFL career statistics

Regular season

Postseason

Career awards and honors

NFL awards
 Super Bowl champion (LVI)
 NFC Champion (2021)
 NFL Comeback Player of the Year
 Pro Bowl (2014)
 2x FedEx Air Player of the Week: Week 2 (2011), Week 11 (2011)
 3x NFC Offensive Player of the Week: Week 11 (2009), Week 1 (2021), Week 3 (2021)

NFL records
 Most passing touchdowns in a single game by a rookie quarterback: 5 (tied with Ray Buivid, Jameis Winston, Deshaun Watson, and Daniel Jones)
 Youngest quarterback to throw for at least five touchdowns in a single game (21 years, 288 days) (November 22, 2009, against the Cleveland Browns)
 First player in NFL history to complete 60% or more of all passes in each game in a season (2015)
 Most games with at least one touchdown pass in a season: 17 (2021)
 Most consecutive 350+ yards passing games: 4 (2011–2012, tied with Drew Brees)
 Most passing yards thrown for in a single game without a touchdown pass: (443, December 22, 2012, against the Atlanta Falcons)
 Most pass attempts per game, season: 45.44, 2012
 Most games with 40+ pass attempts in a season: 13 (2012)
 Fastest player to reach 25,000 career passing yards (90 games played)
 Fastest player to reach 30,000 career passing yards (109 games played)
 Fastest player to reach 35,000 career passing yards (126 games played)
 Fastest player to reach 40,000 career passing yards (147 games played)
 Fastest player to reach 45,000 career passing yards (165 games played)
 Fastest player to reach 50,000 career passing yards (183 games played, tied with Drew Brees)
 Fastest player to reach 3,000 completions (125 games played)
 Most passing yards in first 100 games (27,890)
 Most fourth-quarter comebacks in a season: 8 (2016)
 Most game-winning drives in a single season: 8 (2016)

Detroit Lions franchise records
 Most career pass completions – 3,898 (2009–2020)
 Most passing completions in a single season – 435 (2012)
 Most career pass attempts – 6,224 (2009–2020)
 Most career interceptions – 144
 Most passing attempts in a game – 63 (November 13, 2011, against the Chicago Bears)
 Highest career completion percentage – 62.6% (2009–2020)
 Highest completion percentage in a single season – 67.2% (2015)(tied with Jared Goff (2021))
 Highest completion percentage in a game – 88.0% (December 21, 2015, vs. New Orleans Saints)
 Most career passing yards – 45,109 (2009–2020)
 Most passing yards in a single season – 5,038 (2011)
 Most passing yards in a game – 520 (January 1, 2012, vs. Green Bay Packers)
 Most career 4,000 passing yard seasons – 8
 Most consecutive seasons with 4,000 passing yards – 7 (2011–2017)
 Most career games with 400+ passing yards – 10 (2009–2020)
 Most career games with 300+ passing yards – 49 (2009–2020) 
 Most games with 300+ passing yards in a single season – 8 (2011 and 2012)
 Most passing touchdowns in a single season – 41 (2011)
 Most passing touchdowns in a game – 5 (tied with Gary Danielson)
 Most career passing touchdowns – 282 (2009–2020)
 Most games in a season with at least one passing touchdown – 16 (2011)
 Lowest career interception percentage – 2.3% (2009–2020)
 Most career yards per game – 273.4 (2009–2020)
 Most yards per game in a single season – 314.9 (2011)
 Highest career passer rating – 89.9 (2009–2020)
 Highest passer rating in a single season – 106.0 (2017)
 Most career fourth quarter comeback wins – 31
 Most fourth-quarter comeback wins in a single season – 8 (2016) (NFL record)
 Most career game-winning drives – 38
 Most game-winning drives in a single season – 8 (2016) (NFL record)
 Most consecutive completed pass attempts in a game – 14 (December 4, 2016, vs. New Orleans Saints)
 Most yards per pass attempts, career (minimum 1,500 attempts) 7.2 (tied with Bobby Layne)
 Most wins as a starting quarterback, career: 74
 Most losses as a starting quarterback, career: 90
 Most wins as a starting quarterback, single-season: 11 (2014) (tied with Milt Plum)

Los Angeles Rams franchise records
 Most touchdown passes in a single season –  41 (2021) (tied with Kurt Warner)
 Most passing yards in a single season – 4,886 (2021)
 Most pass completions in a single season – 404 (2021)

Personal life
At Georgia, Stafford met cheerleader Kelly Hall, the sister of former NFL player and current Jacksonville Jaguars wide receivers coach Chad Hall. They were married on April 4, 2015, and have four daughters: twins Chandler and Sawyer (born in March 2017), Hunter Hope (born in August 2018), and Tyler Hall (born in June 2020). In April 2019, Kelly Stafford stated on Instagram that she had a brain tumor. She underwent a 12-hour surgery on April 21. Stafford took time off from being with the Lions, as training camp started up shortly after Kelly's surgery.

In 2015, Stafford donated $1 million to the S.A.Y. Detroit Play Center. In 2018, Stafford was the Lions' Walter Payton Man of the Year nominee. Prior to the 2020 NFL season, the Staffords donated $1.5 million to the University of Georgia. The donation funded social justice initiatives and scholarships for needy students. Around 2021, the Staffords donated $1 million with the purpose of funding an educational center in Detroit after the couple had left for Los Angeles.

See also
 List of 500-yard passing games in the National Football League
 List of NFL quarterbacks with 5,000 passing yards in a season
 List of first overall National Football League draft picks
 List of most consecutive starts by a National Football League quarterback
 List of National Football League career passing completions leaders 
 List of National Football League career passing touchdowns leaders
 List of National Football League career passing yards leaders
 List of National Football League career quarterback wins leaders
 List of Super Bowl starting quarterbacks

References

External links

 Los Angeles Rams bio

1988 births
Living people
American football quarterbacks
American people of Scottish descent
American philanthropists
Detroit Lions players
Ed Block Courage Award recipients
Georgia Bulldogs football players
Highland Park High School (University Park, Texas) alumni
Los Angeles Rams players
National Conference Pro Bowl players
National Football League first-overall draft picks
People from Dunwoody, Georgia
People from Highland Park, Texas
Players of American football from Dallas
Players of American football from Georgia (U.S. state)
Players of American football from Tampa, Florida
Sportspeople from DeKalb County, Georgia
Sportspeople from the Dallas–Fort Worth metroplex
Unconferenced Pro Bowl players